When Greek Meets Greek is a 1922 British silent comedy film directed by Walter West and starring Violet Hopson, Stewart Rome and Lilian Douglas. It was adapted to film from Paul Trent's novel of the same name.

Cast
 Violet Hopson as Christine Ward  
 Stewart Rome as Cyrus Warner  
 Lilian Douglas as Julie Warner  
 Lewis Gilbert as Robert Craven 
 Arthur Walcott as Strike Leader  
 Marjorie Benson as Miss Lockwood  
 Tom Beaumont as Robertson  
 Bert Darley as Heller

References

External links
 
 

1922 films
British comedy films
British silent feature films
Films directed by Walter West
Films set in England
British black-and-white films
1922 comedy films
1920s English-language films
1920s British films
Silent comedy films